The Hiawatha Service, or simply Hiawatha, is an 86-mile (138 km) train route operated by Amtrak on the western shore of Lake Michigan between Chicago, Illinois and Milwaukee, Wisconsin. However, the name was historically applied to several different routes that extended across the Midwest and to the Pacific Ocean. As of 2007, twelve to fourteen trains (seven round-trips, six on Sunday) run daily between Chicago and Milwaukee, making intermediate stops in Glenview, Illinois, Sturtevant, Wisconsin, and Milwaukee Mitchell International Airport. The line is partially supported by funds from the state governments of Wisconsin and Illinois. The line utilizes the Soo Line Railroad (Canadian Pacific) C&M Subdivision.

The service carried over 800,000 passengers in fiscal year 2011, a 4.7% increase over FY2010. Revenue during FY2011 totaled $14,953,873, a 6.1% increase over FY2010. It is Amtrak's ninth-busiest route, and the railroad's busiest line in the Midwest. Ridership has been steadily increasing, with 8 of the last 9 years showing ridership increases as of 2013. Ridership per mile is also very high, exceeded only by the Northeast Regional and the Capitol Corridor. A one-way trip between Milwaukee and Chicago takes about 90 minutes. In the 1930s, the same trip took 75 minutes on the Chicago, Milwaukee, St. Paul and Pacific Railroad's Hiawatha. In 2014, free Wi-Fi service was added to the Hiawatha Service. The service is especially popular with fans attending games involving baseball's Brewers–Cubs rivalry using mass transit, with trains before and after games at either American Family Field or Wrigley Field often filled to capacity.

The route is augmented by Amtrak Thruway Motorcoach routes connecting Green Bay, Appleton, Oshkosh, and Fond du Lac with Milwaukee and Madison, Janesville, and Rockford with Chicago.

On April 24, 2020, the Hiawatha was temporarily replaced by bus service due to the COVID-19 pandemic. Partial service resumed in June 2020, and full service in May 2021.

History

Milwaukee Road 

Historically, the Hiawathas were operated by the Chicago, Milwaukee, St. Paul and Pacific Railroad (also known as the "Milwaukee Road"), and initially traveled from Chicago to the Twin Cities. The first Hiawatha trains ran in 1935. By 1948, five routes carried the Hiawatha name: Chicago–Minneapolis; Chicago–Omaha; Chicago–Wausau–Minocqua; Chicago–Ontanogan; and Chicago-Minneapolis-Seattle.

The Hiawathas were among the world's fastest trains in the 1930s and 1940s, and these trains reached some of their peak speeds on this stretch, directly competing with trains from the Chicago and North Western Railway which ran on roughly parallel tracks. A 90-minute non-stop service between Chicago and Milwaukee was first introduced in the mid-1930s, and this later fell to 75 minutes for several years. The train slowed to a schedule of 80 minutes, although an added stop in Glenview also contributed to a longer travel time.

Amtrak 
Under Amtrak, which assumed control of most intercity passenger rail service in the United States on May 1, 1971, the Hiawatha name survived in two forms. The first was a Chicago–Milwaukee–Minneapolis service, known simply as the Hiawatha. This would be renamed the Twin Cities Hiawatha, then extended to Seattle and renamed the North Coast Hiawatha. This service ended in 1979.

The second was a Chicago–Milwaukee corridor train known as the Hiawatha Service (as opposed to Hiawatha). Although Amtrak had retained Chicago–Milwaukee service during the transition, it did not name these trains until October 29, 1972. At this time both Hiawatha and Hiawatha Service could be found on the same timetable. On June 15, 1976, Amtrak introduced Turboliners to the route and the name Hiawatha Service left the timetable, not to return until 1989. The Chicago–Milwaukee trains were known simply as "Turboliners" (as were comparable trains on the Chicago–Detroit and Chicago – St. Louis corridors) until October 26, 1980, when Amtrak introduced individual names for each of the trains: The Badger, the LaSalle, the Nicollet, and the Radisson. This practice ended on October 29, 1989, when the name Hiawatha Service returned as an umbrella term for all Chicago–Milwaukee service.

A resurfacing project on Interstate 94 led to a three-month trial of service west of Milwaukee to Watertown, Wisconsin beginning on April 13, 1998. Intermediate stops included Wauwatosa, Elm Grove, Pewaukee, and Oconomowoc. Amtrak extended four of the six daily Hiawathas over the route. The Canadian Pacific Railway, which owned the tracks through its American subsidiary Soo Line Railroad, estimated that the route would require between $15–33 million in capital investment before it could host the extended service permanently. Money was not forthcoming and service ended July 11. The three-month trial cost $1.4 million and carried 32,000 passengers.

Potential stops included Elm Grove, Brookfield, Slinger, and Lomira. Travel time would be nearly two hours. Amtrak hoped to attract mail and express business along the route as part of its Network Growth Strategy, similar to the short-lived Lake Country Limited. Amtrak abandoned the idea in September 2001.

In 2005, another station opened on the line, the Milwaukee Airport Railroad Station at Milwaukee Mitchell International Airport. The expansion was intended to facilitate travel to and from the airport, with shuttles running between the station and the main terminal. The new station also gave residents on the south side of Milwaukee easier access to the service, along with an alternative to the central station in downtown, which is now fully accessible after completion of the Marquette Interchange. The station was primarily funded and is maintained by the Wisconsin Department of Transportation.

It is proposed that the Hiawatha Service, along with the Empire Builder, would shift one stop north to North Glenview in Glenview, Illinois. This move would eliminate lengthy stops which block traffic on Glenview Road. This move would involve reconstruction of the North Glenview station to handle the additional traffic, and depends on commitments from Glenview, the Illinois General Assembly, and Metra.

The route is coextensive with the far southern leg of the Empire Builder, Amtrak's long-distance service from Chicago to the Pacific Northwest. The Empire Builder stops at Glenview and Milwaukee, but normally does so in both cases only to receive passengers northbound and discharge passengers southbound.

COVID-19 pandemic

Train service was suspended on April 24, 2020, due to the COVID-19 pandemic, replaced with an Amtrak Thruway Motorcoach route between Milwaukee and Chicago. To make up for the loss of service, the Empire Builder added stops at Sturtevant and Milwaukee Airport, and temporarily allowed local travel between Chicago and Milwaukee.

The Hiawatha returned on June 1, 2020, with a single round trip: a morning departure to Chicago and an evening return to Milwaukee. Three daily round trips and two weekend round trips returned on June 29. The Hiawatha had long run with a mix of reserved and unreserved seating, but Amtrak, IDOT, and WisDOT temporarily required reservations for passengers without multi-ride tickets in order to maintain social distancing. Amtrak also required facial coverings and stopped accepting cash. The Peak Fare Surcharge was suspended for these trains.

On May 23, 2021, Hiawatha Service returned to its full pre-pandemic schedule. Thruway bus service to Green Bay also resumed that day.

Corridor names 
This table shows the names given to trains which operated over the Chicago-Milwaukee corridor under Amtrak. It excludes long-distance trains such as the Empire Builder and North Coast Hiawatha whose local stopping patterns were restricted. The Abraham Lincoln and Prairie State were Chicago-St. Louis services which Amtrak extended through Chicago to the north in the early 1970s.

Ridership

Due primarily to the route's popularity, its northern terminus, Milwaukee Intermodal Station, is Amtrak's 18th-busiest station nationwide and second-busiest in the Midwest.

Notes:

Equipment 
Three trainsets are required to operate the service. The usual Hiawatha train sets are formed of one Siemens SC-44 locomotive on the southward end, an EMD F40PH derived "control car" on the northward end, and six Horizon Fleet 68-seat coaches. One car at the rear end in the direction of travel is designated a "quiet" car with limitations placed on cell phone usage and loud conversations. During winter months, an Amfleet coach is normally used on each end in lieu of a Horizon coach to serve as quiet cars.

On July 17, 2009, the State of Wisconsin announced it would purchase two new train sets from Spanish manufacturer Talgo in preparation for the enhanced-speed service that received funding in early 2010. However, Governor Scott Walker rejected the federal funding and cancelled the project. Talgo opened a manufacturing plant in Milwaukee to construct the trainsets for the Hiawatha Service, and the company hoped the plant would also build trains for future high-speed lines in the region. The two sets built were stored in the former Talgo plant until May 2014, when Amtrak moved them to its maintenance facility near Indianapolis, Indiana. They will remain stored there pending their possible use on other Amtrak routes. The unpowered tilting trainsets are 14 cars long including a cab car, eleven coaches (five of which have restrooms), one bistro car, and one end car including a bicycle rack. The cars wear a red-and-white livery in homage to the University of Wisconsin. In 2022, the two trainsets were sold to Nigeria for use on the Lagos Rail Mass Transit.

In August 2019, the Federal Railroad Administration awarded WisDOT up to $25.2 million to purchase six new coaches and three new cab cars for the route, allowing the replacement of the NPCUs. The new equipment is expected to enter service in 2022.

Proposed extensions 
In 2021, Amtrak proposed adding three new Hiawatha Service round trips by 2035. This would bring the total frequency between Chicago and Milwaukee to ten daily round trips. All trips would extend beyond Milwaukee, with four daily trains to Madison, three to Saint Paul, and three to Green Bay. In November 2021, Congress passed the Infrastructure Investment and Jobs Act, which includes $4 billion for public transportation in Illinois. A portion of these funds are expected to go to Hiawatha Service improvements.

Madison 
In 2009, Wisconsin applied for funding from an $8 billion pool allocated for rail projects under the American Recovery and Reinvestment Act, and the Chicago–Milwaukee–Madison–Minneapolis/St. Paul corridor was allocated $823 million. $810 million of that was to support extending Amtrak services to Madison, which had not seen direct intercity service since 1971. Another $12 million would have been used to upgrade the line between Chicago and Milwaukee, and an additional $600,000 was granted to study future alignments to the Twin Cities.

The Madison extension was initially planned to include stops in Brookfield, Oconomowoc, and Watertown, but Oconomowoc and Brookfield were reluctant to move forward with station planning due to cost concerns. The Wisconsin Department of Transportation (WisDOT) dropped Oconomowoc from the planned route in August 2010, and Brookfield was waiting to see the outcome of elections in November before making a decision on whether to build a station. The nearby cities of Hartland and Wauwatosa had expressed interest in hosting stations. The extension was expected to begin service by 2013.

The project became a political issue in the 2010 Wisconsin gubernatorial election. Republican candidate Scott Walker promised he would stop the project and return the money the state received if elected. 

At the end of October 2010, Wisconsin governor Jim Doyle and the federal government signed an agreement that bound the state to spend the federal funds granted to construct the route, regardless of the results of the 2010 gubernatorial election. On November 4, two days after Scott Walker won the gubernatorial election, however, Doyle ordered work on the line to be temporarily halted, and on November 9 said that he planned to leave the choice of whether or not to operate the train to Walker. On December 9, 2010, U.S. Transportation Secretary Ray LaHood announced that much of the $810 million that Wisconsin was supposed to get would be redistributed to other states, including California, Florida, and Washington.

The Madison extension was included in the 2022 Amtrak Connects Us initiative, with the goal of establishing service by 2035. An extension to Madison has been cited by the US Department of Transportation as “critical to operational viability of the Core Express corridor between Chicago and Minneapolis-St. Paul” and that it should be “included on any mainline route alignment.” As such the City of Madison has renewed work on establishing a location for a passenger rail terminal.

Twin Cities 

There are proposals to extend one or more Hiawatha trips from Milwaukee to Minneapolis–Saint Paul, Minnesota, serving the Twin Cities-Milwaukee-Chicago (TCMC) corridor.

A 2015 feasibility report by Amtrak looked at extending one round trip as a "second train" along the route of the Empire Builder through La Crosse. Annual ridership was forecast between 117,800 and 155,500 if the service ended at Saint Paul Union Depot, and higher if it extended to Target Field, Fridley, or St. Cloud.

The total cost to extend one round trip to Saint Paul has been placed at $53 million. In May 2020, a $12.6 million federal grant was awarded to offset the first three years of operations. A $31.8 million grant followed in September 2020 for final design work and construction. Amtrak provided $5 million in matching funds, Wisconsin $6.2 million, and Minnesota promised $10 million.

, this extension to Saint Paul is projected to start in 2024.

In its 2020-2035 expansion vision, Amtrak proposed extending three Hiawatha trips from Milwaukee to the Twin Cities. One would compliment the Empire Builder, while two would take a new route with stops in Camp Douglas, Eau Claire, Menomonie, and Hudson. The Milwaukee–Saint Paul trip time is estimated at 6 hours 45 minutes.

Green Bay 

Amtrak has proposed extending three Hiawatha trips from Milwaukee to Green Bay by 2035, with stops in Fond du Lac, Oshkosh, and Appleton. The Milwaukee–Green Bay trip time is estimated at 2 hours 50 minutes.

Station stops

See also 
Midwest Regional Rail Initiative

References

Notes

External links

Hiawatha Official Website

Amtrak routes
Passenger rail transportation in Wisconsin
Passenger rail transportation in Illinois